Chonocentrum is a genus of the family Phyllanthaceae described as a genus in 1922. It contains only known species, Chonocentrum cyathophorum, native to the State of Amazonas in northwestern Brazil.

The genus is still not well understood; W. John Hayden has observed that the plant seems have been collected just once, in upper Rio Negro of Brazil in the 1850s, and suggests that it has been misplaced taxonomically.

References 

Phyllanthaceae
Monotypic Malpighiales genera
Flora of Brazil
Phyllanthaceae genera